A recall election in the state of Wisconsin is a procedure by which voters can remove an elected official from office through a direct vote before his or her term has ended.

History
In 1911, newly elected Governor Francis E. McGovern laid out his progressive vision for Wisconsin, which included a proposal for a recall. The next week, State Senator Paul O. Husting introduced Senate Joint Resolution 9, which allowed for the recall of every office holder in the state, including both those elected and appointed. Several senators did not like that the recall also applied to judges, and attached an exemption for judges. The bill passed the Senate 20-7. The bill was then passed by the Assembly 64-1.

Since proposed amendments to the Wisconsin Constitution must pass two consecutive legislatures before going to the people for a vote, Husting introduced his bill again on February 11, 1913. The bill passed the Senate 26-1, and the Assembly 72-17. The proposed amendment then when to the voters, who, in November 1914, voted it down by a margin of 64 percent to 36 percent.

A second attempt at a recall amendment came in 1923, when Senator Henry Huber introduced Senate Joint Resolution 39, which allowed for the recall of public officials. It passed the Senate 17-12, and the Assembly 60-10. In 1924, Huber was elected Lieutenant Governor of Wisconsin, so the second introduction of the resolution was taken up by Max W. Heck. It passed the Senate 22-8, and the Assembly 70-22. The resolution was scheduled to appear on the November 2, 1926 ballot.

There was strong opposition to the proposed amendment, because it allowed for the recall of state judges. Organizations, such as the State Bar of Wisconsin, the Milwaukee Bar Association, Archbishop Sebastian Gebhard Messmer and the editorial boards of the Milwaukee Journal and the Milwaukee Sentinel.

The proposed amendment also had its supporters, including the editorial board of the Wisconsin State Journal, the Wisconsin State Federation of Labor, and U.S. Senator Robert M. La Follette Jr.

The amendment passed, by a margin of 50.6 percent to 49.4 percent.

In 2011, State Senator Jim Holperin became the first state legislator to be subject to a recall in two different legislative bodies: the Assembly in 1990, and the State Senate in 2011.

In 2012, Governor Scott Walker became the first governor in U.S. history to survive a recall.

Legislation summary

1926 creation
The recall was officially created in November 1926 by constitutional amendment. The rules established in the constitution are:
 Voters may petition for the recall of any elected official after the first year of their term
 The petition must be signed by voters equal to at least 25 percent of the vote in the last gubernatorial election in the district from which the elected official is to be recalled
 A special election will be held between 40 and 45 days from the filing of the petition
 The official being recalled will continue to perform their duties until the result of the election is officially declared
 Other candidates for the office will be nominated in accordance with normal election rules
 The candidate who receives the most votes will serve for the remainder of the term
 The name of the elected official who is being recalled will be on the ballot unless they resign within 10 days of the petition being filed
 After one successful petition and election, no other recall attempts can be made for the remainder of the term

1981 amendment
In 1981, the constitution was amended, which changed the rules for recalls. This amendment changed the rules, which follow:
 Voters may petition for the recall of any elected official after the first year of their term
 The petition must be signed by voters equal to at least 25 percent of the vote in the last gubernatorial election in the district from which the elected official is to be recalled
 A special election will be held on the Tuesday six weeks after the petition is filed, or the next Tuesday if that day is a holiday
 The official being recalled will continue to perform their duties until the result of the election is officially declared
 Other candidates for the office will be nominated in accordance with normal election rules
 If more than two people run for a nonpartisan office, or if more than two people run in the same political party for a partisan office, a recall primary will be held
 In the case of a recall primary, the date above will be used, and the general election will be held on the Tuesday four weeks after the primary
 The name of the elected official who is being recalled will be on the ballot unless they resign within 10 days of the petition being filed
 After one successful petition and election, no other recall attempts can be made for the remainder of the term

Recall attempts

Successful recalls
1977 recall of Dane County Judge Archie Simonson
1977 recall of five members of the La Crosse School Board
1992 recall of four members of the La Crosse School Board
1996 recall of State Senator George Petak
2000 recall of Margaret Ciccone, Mayor of Superior, Wisconsin 
2002 recall of multiple Milwaukee County, Wisconsin, elected county officials including Executive F. Thomas Ament (resigned before election); Board Chair Karen Ordinans; and Board Supervisors Penny Podell, LeAnn Launstein, David Jasenski, Kathy Arciszewski, James McGuigan, and Linda Ryan. All were recalled due to a retirement pension controversy.
2003 recall of State Senator Gary George
2009 recall of seven Monroe County, Wisconsin board members
2009 recall of one Monroe County, Wisconsin board member
2011 recall of State Senator Randy Hopper
2011 recall of State Senator Dan Kapanke
 2012 recall of Bob Ryan, Mayor of Sheboygan, Wisconsin
 2012 recall of State Senator Van H. Wanggaard
2015 Door County, successful recall of 13 of 15, out of 21 County Board members total. 
 2017 recall of Jake Speed, Onalaska School Board member
 2018 recall of Taavi McMahon, Trempealeau County District Attorney
 2021 recall of Ronnie Rossberger, Mellen School Board Vice-President

Unsuccessful recalls
1932 recall election of State Senator Otto Mueller
1990 recall of State Assemblyman Jim Holperin
1990 recall of US Congressmen Dave Obey
2009 recall of one Monroe County, Wisconsin board member
2011 recall of State Senator Dave Hansen
2011 recall of State Senator Robert Cowles
2011 recall of State Senator Sheila Harsdorf
2011 recall of State Senator Luther Olsen
2011 recall of State Senator Alberta Darling
2011 recall of State Senator Robert Wirch
2011 recall of State Senator Jim Holperin
2012 recall of Governor Scott Walker
2012 recall of Lieutenant Governor Rebecca Kleefisch
2012 recall of State Senator Scott L. Fitzgerald
2012 recall of State Senator Terry Moulton
2013 recall of La Crosse, Wisconsin Common Council President Audrey Kader
2016 recall of three members of the Town of Paris Board, Kenosha County
2021 recall of four Mequon-Thiensville School Board members; Wendy Francour, Erik Hollander, Akram Khan, Chris Schultz
2021 recall of Butternut School Board President, Gary Mertig

See also
 Recall election
 Wisconsin Senate recall elections, 2011
 Wisconsin Senate recall elections, 2012
 Wisconsin gubernatorial recall election, 2012

References

External links
Encyclopedia of American Politics-Recall elections in Wisconsin

Wisconsin
Right to petition
History of Wisconsin
Wisconsin elections